As I Open My Eyes is a 2015 French-Tunisian drama film directed by Leyla Bouzid. It was screened in the Contemporary World Cinema section of the 2015 Toronto International Film Festival. Baya Medhaffar stars as a teenage rock singer. The film is Bouzid's first feature. It was selected as the Tunisian entry for the Best Foreign Language Film at the 89th Academy Awards. However, the film was not included on the final list of submissions published by the Academy.

Plot
In Tunisia in the summer of 2010, 18-year-old Farah Kallel wraps up school exams and prepares to enter university. In the meantime, she has joined a band and is secretly dating the lute player, Borhène. Unbeknownst to Farah, her band is already being watched by the police, as their songs are critical of the current government. Farah's mother, Hayet (Ghalia Benali) receives a visit from an old friend, Moncef, who warns her of the police involvement and warns her to watch her daughter. However, the night of their first gig, Farah locks her mother in her room and escapes to sing at the gig. The performance goes well, giving Farah confidence to continue with her musical pursuits, despite Hayet wanting Farah to study medicine at university.

After several more gigs, Borhène arrives at a rehearsal having been interrogated and beaten by the police all night. He accuses Ali, the band's manager who has been taping all of their performances, of being a cop and informing on the band. Later, Ali approaches Farah and tells her he has been protecting her and tries to warn her further but she ignores him.

Going to a bus station, on the way to visit her father, Farah goes missing. Hayet tries everything to locate her but eventually realizes that Farah has been taken by the police. She goes to Borhène who tries to convince her that they should get publicity to force the police to release Farah, but she decides to go a different way, contacting Moncef who tells her where Farah is located.

In prison, Farah has been beaten and sexually assaulted. She is eventually released to her parents, but sinks into a deep depression, quitting her band. Hayet manages to help Farah find her voice again and sings with her in her room.

Cast
 Baya Medhaffar as Farah
 Ghalia Benali as Hayet
 Montassar Ayari as Borhėne

Reception
The film received positive reviews upon its release. It holds a 100% fresh ratings from Rotten Tomatoes and a 7.5 average rating. The critic for Variety called it an "impressive debut" and called Medhaffer's acting "a stand-out lead perf". A critic for Indiewire gave the film a score of A- and called it "the Best Fictional Film Yet About the Arab Spring." The Hollywood Reporter was less enthused about the film criticizing its "mostly familiar notes" but praising the cinematography and acting.

Accolades

See also
 List of submissions to the 89th Academy Awards for Best Foreign Language Film
 List of Tunisian submissions for the Academy Award for Best Foreign Language Film

References

External links
 

2015 films
2015 drama films
French drama films
2010s French-language films
2015 directorial debut films
Tunisian drama films
2010s French films